The 2001 World Junior Figure Skating Championships were held from February 26 to March 2 at the Winter Sports Hall in Sofia, Bulgaria. Medals were awarded in men's singles, ladies' singles, pair skating, and ice dancing. Due to the large number of participants, the men's and ladies' qualifying groups were split into groups A and B.

Medals table

Competition notes
Susanna Pöykiö became the first Finnish ladies' singles skater to medal at an ISU Championships.

Yuko Kavaguti / Alexander Markuntsov became the first pair representing Japan to medal at an ISU Championships.

This was the first World Junior Figure Skating Championships that The National Anthem of The Russian Fedoration was heard.

Results

Men

Ladies

Pairs

Ice dancing

References

External links
 2001 World Junior Figure Skating Championships

World Junior Figure Skating Championships
World Junior Figure Skating Championships, 2001
F
World Junior 2001